Llandilo is a suburb of Sydney, in the state of New South Wales, Australia 54 kilometres north-west of the Sydney central business district, in the local government area of the City of Penrith. It is part of the Greater Western Sydney region. Llandilo is a small semi-rural outcrop between two creeks.

A southern part of Llandilo was incorporated into an expansion of the suburb of Jordan Springs on 22 November 2019.

History
Llandilo is named after the Welsh town of Llandeilo.

Aboriginal culture
Prior to European settlement, what is now Llandilo was home to the Mulgoa people who spoke the Darug language. They lived a hunter-gatherer lifestyle governed by traditional laws, which had their origins in the Dreamtime. Their homes were bark huts called 'gunyahs'. They hunted kangaroos and emus for meat, and gathered yams, berries and other native plants. Shortly after the arrival of the First Fleet in Australia in 1788, an outbreak of smallpox decimated the local indigenous communities and made it easier for settlers to dispossess them of their land.

European settlement
The first land grant in the area was made to Samuel Terry in 1818. He named the area Terry Brook. By the 1860s it was known as Llandilo after a Welsh town.

Llandilo Post Office opened on 1 July 1890.

Schools
Llandilo public is the local school, established 1866.

Xavier College, a Catholic school was completed in 2008.

References

External links
 Penrith Local Suburb Profiles

Suburbs of Sydney
City of Penrith